Himalayan Aviation was an airline based in India that operated in the northern parts of the Indian subcontinent until its nationalization and merger into Indian Airlines in 1953.

Incidents

 On 20 February 1950, Himalayan Aviation ran the first ever international flight from Nepal, from Gauchar (Nepal) to Calcutta (now Kolkata) (India).
 On 7 December 1951, Pakistan detained a Himalayan Aviation flight from Ahmedabad, India, to Kabul, Afghanistan, at the stopover point in Karachi. Pakistan had previously denied use of the direct Delhi-Kabul air-corridor that overflew the North West Frontier Province. India and Pakistan had worked out an alternative Ahmadabad-Karachi-Zahedan(Iran)-Kabul route.

Services 
Himalayan Aviation began with chartered flights. Over time, it expanded to night-mail services and scheduled passenger flights. In order to maximize revenue, it began taking on passengers on its night-mail flights as well.

Fleet 
The fleet mostly consisted of Douglas DC-3 aircraft.

References

Defunct airlines of India
Companies based in Kolkata
Airlines established in 1948
Airlines disestablished in 1953
Indian companies established in 1948
1953 disestablishments in India
1948 establishments in West Bengal